The following compact discs, sold by Sony BMG, were shipped with the computer software known as Extended Copy Protection (XCP). As a result, any Microsoft Windows computer that has been used to play these CDs is likely to have had XCP installed. This can cause a number of serious security problems. Several security software vendors, including Microsoft, regard XCP as a trojan horse, spyware, or rootkit. MacOS systems that were used to play these CDs may have been affected with a similar program, MediaMax.

Album list

See also
 List of compact discs sold with MediaMax CD-3
 Sony BMG copy protection rootkit scandal

References

External links
 Sony BMG list of XCP CDs
 EFF list of XCP CDs
 Geoffrey McCalebs list of XCP CDs 

Compact Disc and DVD copy protection
Sony
Rootkits
Technology-related lists